The England women's national under-17 football team, also known as the Young Lionesses, represents England in association football at an under-17 age level and is controlled by the Football Association, the governing body for football in England. England women's national under-17 football team best achievement is a third-place finish at the 2016 UEFA Women's Under-17 Championship.

FIFA U-17 Women's World Cup

The team has competed at two FIFA U-17 Women's World Cup tournaments.

*Draws include knockout matches decided by penalty shoot-outs.

UEFA Women's Under-17 Championship

The team has participated in seven UEFA Women's Under-17 Championship tournaments.

*Draws include knockout matches decided by penalty shoot-outs.
**Red border colour denotes tournament was held on home soil.

Current squad
The following 20 players were named to the squad for round 2 of 2023 U17 UEFA qualification in March 2023. Head coach: Natalie Henderson

Recent callups
The following players have also been called up to the England U17 squad within the last twelve months.

This list may be incomplete.

Previous squads
2008 FIFA U-17 Women's World Cup
2016 FIFA U-17 Women's World Cup

Recent schedule and results
This list includes match results from the past 12 months, as well as any future matches that have been scheduled.

2022

2023

References

Youth football in England
Foot
Women's national under-17 association football teams